Ratibor or Ratiboř may refer to:

People
Ratibor (Polabian prince) (died 1043), a prince of the Obotrite confederacy from the Polabian tribe
Ratibor I, Duke of Pomerania (1124–1156), duke of the House of Pomerania (Griffins)
Ratibor II, Duke of Pomerania (died after 1223), a Pomeranian duke, son of Ratibor I

Places
Ratibor, the German name of Racibórz, a town in the Silesian Voivodeship, southern Poland
Ratiboř (Jindřichův Hradec District), a municipality and village in the South Bohemian Region of the Czech Republic
Ratiboř (Vsetín District), a municipality and village in the Zlín Region of the Czech Republic
Duchy of Ratibor, was one of the duchies of Silesia
Ratibor, Texas, a small community in Central Texas

Other uses
Schloss Ratibor, castle in Roth, Germany
SV Ratibor 03, was a German association football club from the city of Ratibor, Upper Silesia (today Racibórz, Poland)